The Out In Africa South African Gay and Lesbian Film Festival (OIA) is a gay and lesbian film festival launched in 1994 to celebrate the inclusion, in the South African Constitution, of the clause prohibiting discrimination on the grounds of sexual orientation. The Festival set out to address the lack of visibility of Lesbian, Gay, Bisexual, Transgender and Intersex individuals (LGBTIs) in South African social and cultural life after decades of apartheid repression, to counter negative images of LGBTIs that prevail in traditional and religious communities, and to serve as a platform for discussion and debate about the situation of LGBTIs in a newly founded democracy.

The festival runs annually in Johannesburg and Cape Town, with smaller "satellite" film festivals in other towns as part of an outreach programme.

Films are sometimes followed by question and answer sessions or panel discussions after the screenings of select films. The festival runs for around 20 days each year, in either late September, October, or early November.

Local and international films and shorts are screened, ranging in genre from drama and comedy to documentaries. Many of the films shown have won multiple international awards.

See also

List of LGBT events
List of LGBT film festivals

References

External links
 Official website

LGBT film festivals
LGBT culture in South Africa
LGBT events in South Africa
Film festivals in South Africa
Film festivals established in 1994
Spring (season) events in South Africa
Festivals in Cape Town
Festivals in Johannesburg